Liquorice Stick or alternatively spelled Licorice Stick, also known as a "Regaliz", is a highball (cocktail) made of cola, anisette or absinthe, and Liquorice sticks as a garnish. It originated in Terceira Island, Azores, Portugal where it was called a "pauzinho de alcaçuz" as an alternative to the rum and cola drink called a "cuba libre". In Spain it is called a "palito de orozuz". It was introduced into the U.S. through the Portuguese communities in Massachusetts and Rhode Island.

Recipe variations 
Licorice stick cocktails can be mixed with just about any anis flavored liqueur.

Local variations 
In Portugal, where the drink originates, it is often mixed with "anisette" but an older method considered more authentic is to make the drink using "absinthe" then cola is poured in over a sugar cube and ice
In Spain there is another variation, made with Anis del Mono and cola
In Greece Thessaloniki, there is another variant, that consists of "ouzo" and cola
In the Italy the drink is usually served with "sambuca" instead of anisette and mixed with cola

Portuguese cuisine
Cocktails with liquorice
Cocktails with absinthe